Richard "Dick" Williams is a rock climber and entrepreneur from the Hudson River Valley of New York. He pioneered many first ascents in the Shawangunk Ridge and established the area's first rock climbing store in New Paltz on April 10, 1970. The store is called Rock & Snow and is still there today under new ownership.

Dick was one of the original Vulgarians, a group of climbers in the 1960s who were opposed to the government attempting to license and regulate rock climbing. As a sign of protest, the Vulgarians often climbed nude.
He has written numerous rock climbing guidebooks for the area including the most recent A Climber's Guide To The Shawangunks.

References 

Year of birth missing (living people)
Living people
American rock climbers
Businesspeople from New York (state)